Claudia "Dolly" Powers (born May 28, 1950) is an American politician who served in the Connecticut House of Representatives from the 151st district between 1993 and 2009. Powers began her tenure in the Connecticut House of Representatives in 1993 from the Republican party, having beaten Democrat Elaine Markley Schuman with 65 percent of the vote for the 151st district in Greenwich. After that, she was re-elected seven times, leaving in January 2009 with the election of Republican Fred Camillo.

Connecticut House of Representatives

Busing 
In 1993, Powers was the only House legislator to vote against a measure that provided $2.6 million for public bus subsidies in Bridgeport and New Haven. Powers stated that she did not vote for the plan because it did not contain any funding for her home district in Greenwich; the Hartford Courant wrote that Greenwich was an "affluent community" along with other Connecticut cities that received no funding, such as New Canaan, Darien, and Westport.

Hospice care 
In 2007, Powers proposed bills in the Connecticut House of Representatives that would have included hospice in the Connecticut's Medicare program, which were introduced after her father received hospice care. Powers commented to the Courant that "it made all the difference in my family"; she also stated that Connecticut state prison inmates have access to hospice care through a government program introduced in 2001.

Later life 
After leaving the Connecticut House of Representatives, Powers became a columnist for the Greenwich Time.

Electoral history

References

Election results

 
 
 
 
 
 
 
 
 

1950 births
Living people
People from Key West, Florida
Women state legislators in Connecticut
Republican Party members of the Connecticut House of Representatives
21st-century American women